

China

Poets (by date of birth)
 Jia Yi (200 - 168 BCE)
 Sima Xiangru (179-117 BCE), Western Han
 Sima Qian (145 - ? BCE)

South Asia

Poets
 Approximate time of Tiruvalluvar (300 - 100 BCE), writing in Tamil

Works
Compilation of the Pathinenmaelkanakku (Eighteen Major Anthology Series) of early Tamil poetry.

Mediterranean world

Poets (by date of birth)
 Antipater of Sidon
 Lucius Afranius (poet)

Works
 likely latest date for the Book of Proverbs, written in Hebrew

References

Poetry by century
Poetry